Hans von Borsody (20 September 1929 – 4 November 2013) was a German film actor.

He was born in Vienna into an artistic family of Hungarian descent. His father Eduard was a film director, his uncle Julius a set designer. His daughter Suzanne is an actress. When Borsody was three, his family moved to Berlin and obtained German citizenship. 

He was married to Karin Dittmann, Rosemarie Fendel, Alwy Becker and Heide Keller.

Death
Hans von Borsody died in Kiel, aged 83.

Filmography

References

External links
 

1929 births
2013 deaths
German male film actors
German people of Austrian descent
German people of Hungarian descent
Male actors from Vienna